Joshy  is a 2016 American comedy-drama film written and directed by Jeff Baena. It stars Thomas Middleditch, Adam Pally, Alex Ross Perry, Nick Kroll, Brett Gelman, Jenny Slate and Lauren Graham. It was shown in the U.S. Dramatic Competition section at the 2016 Sundance Film Festival. The film was released on August 12, 2016, by Lionsgate Premiere.

Plot
Josh returns home from work on his birthday. His fiancée Rachel agrees to cook dinner while Josh is at the gym. Josh returns home to find out that Rachel asphyxiated herself with a belt.

Four months later, Josh along with his friends Ari, Adam and Eric decide to spend the weekend, that was supposed to be Josh's bachelor party, at a ranch in Ojai. At a bar the first night, Ari meets a girl named Jodi and finds a connection with her; Adam finds out that his girlfriend wants to break up with him; and Eric, wanting to keep the night alive, invites his friend Greg over. Jodi, being locked out of her place, crashes in with the guys at their place after a fun night.

The next morning, their friend Aaron arrives with his wife and kid only to find the place infested with drugs and booze. An argument erupts between Eric and Aaron over the matter of Josh's state of mind and the current situation. Aaron storms off with his family and the guys spend the day out with Greg learning about Rachel's death from Ari. After getting high, Greg becomes extremely emotional due to his troubled past. They head to the bar and find Jodi and her friends there. Ari tells Jodi that he is married which makes Jodi distance herself from Ari. They return home downcast, so Eric invites two strippers to keep the night alive, and an argument breaks out between Eric and Adam. Josh and Eric realize there is a mysterious man stalking them who they try to confront, but in vain.

The next day Eric invites several prostitutes, one for each of them, but the party is interrupted by the arrival of Rachel's parents who are there to confront Josh. The parents ask for details of the events leading up to Rachel's death, accusing Josh of hiding his guilt by colluding with the police. They show Josh pictures of the guys with the stripper from the previous night, as the “stalker” was hired to spy on them, and inform him that a second autopsy report found that the cause Rachel's death, suicide, was inconclusive. Josh, in a fit of rage, tears the bag they brought with them only to find out a wire inside it, implying that they were there to get him to confess to the murder of their daughter. Josh asks them to leave and goes to his friends and opens up. They console him, and the group decides to finally play the board game Adam wanted to play since the beginning.

The group spends the last night of the weekend playing the "very complex board game" and is joined by Jodi. After the game, Jodi gets up to leave so Ari walks her to the door and kisses her. Jodi realizes that Ari is a married man, ends their embrace abruptly and walks out. The next morning the group bids farewell to each other and decides to meet again some time soon. Josh and Ari are the last to leave. The movie ends with Josh wanting to say something to Ari, but hesitates and Ari drives away.

Cast

 Thomas Middleditch as Josh
 Adam Pally as Ari
 Alex Ross Perry as Adam
 Nick Kroll as Eric
 Brett Gelman as Greg
 Jenny Slate as Jodi
 Aubrey Plaza as Jen 
 Joe Swanberg as Aaron
 Kris Swanberg as Anita
 Lauren Graham as Katee
 Alison Brie as Rachel
 Jake Johnson as Reggie
 Lisa Edelstein as Claudia
 Lauren Weedman as Isadora
 Paul Reiser as Steve
 Frankie Shaw as Crystal
 Paul Weitz as Private Investigator

Production
Production on the film lasted 15 days, only shooting off a 20-page outline, with the rest of the dialogue improvised by the cast. In December 2015, it was announced that Devendra Banhart would compose the score for the film.

Release
The film had its world premiere at the 2016 Sundance Film Festival on January 24, 2016. In March 2016, Lionsgate Premiere and Hulu acquired distribution rights to the film. The film was released on August 12, 2016.

Critical reception
Joshy has received positive reviews from film critics. It holds an 81% rating on review aggregator website Rotten Tomatoes, based on 26 reviews, with an average rating of 6.4/10. The site's consensus states, "Writer/director Jeff Baena and an able cast of comedic actors strike a unique, disarmingly heartfelt blend of dark humor and tragedy with Joshy." On Metacritic, the film holds a rating of 62 out of 100, based on 10 critics, indicating "generally favorable reviews".

Geoff Berkshire of Variety gave the film a mixed review writing: "Boasting a hodgepodge of strong comic voices riffing their way through underdeveloped characters, writer-director Jeff Baena’s second feature after the under-appreciated zombie romantic comedy Life After Beth is an altogether looser affair, but rarely to its benefit. The name cast guarantees ancillary interest, though theatrical life should be even briefer than Beth’s.”

References

External links
 
 
 
 

2016 films
2016 comedy-drama films
2016 independent films
American comedy-drama films
American independent films
Lionsgate films
American Zoetrope films
Films directed by Jeff Baena
2010s English-language films
2010s American films